Frise may refer to:

 Frise, Somme, a commune of the Somme department in France
 Leslie Frise (1895-1979), British aerospace engineer and aircraft designer
 Aileron#Frise ailerons, a type of aircraft part

See also